is a former Japanese football player who is currently a football referee.

Club statistics

References

External links

1984 births
Living people
Osaka University of Health and Sport Sciences alumni
Association football people from Nagasaki Prefecture
Japanese footballers
J1 League players
J2 League players
Ventforet Kofu players
Thespakusatsu Gunma players
Kataller Toyama players
Association football defenders